Omega Mountain is a  summit located in the Tantalus Range, in Tantalus Provincial Park, in southwestern British Columbia, Canada. Its nearest higher peak is Mount Pelops,  to the west. Lake Lovely Water lies below the northwestern slope of the peak with Alpha Mountain on the opposite side of the lake. Precipitation runoff from the peak drains into tributaries of the Squamish River. The first ascent of the mountain was made in 1916 by Tom Fyles and his brother, John Fyles. The mountain's name comes from Omega, in keeping with nearby peaks being named for Greek alphabet letters, namely Alpha and Iota mountains. Its name was officially adopted on June 6, 1957, by the Geographical Names Board of Canada.

Climate

Based on the Köppen climate classification, Omega Mountain is located in the marine west coast climate zone of western North America. Most weather fronts originate in the Pacific Ocean, and travel east toward the Coast Mountains where they are forced upward by the range (Orographic lift), causing them to drop their moisture in the form of rain or snowfall. As a result, the Coast Mountains experience high precipitation, especially during the winter months in the form of snowfall. Temperatures can drop below −20 °C with wind chill factors below −30 °C. This climate supports a small glacier remnant on the northeast slope of Omega. The months July through September offer the most favorable weather for climbing Omega.

Climbing Routes
Established rock climbing routes on Omega Mountain:

 West Ridge -   
 North Side -

See also

 Geography of British Columbia
 Geology of British Columbia

References

External links
 Weather: Omega Mountain
 Tom Fyles: Vimeo

One-thousanders of British Columbia
Pacific Ranges
Sea-to-Sky Corridor
New Westminster Land District